Farewells (also titled Lydia Ate the Apple and Partings in the United States) is the English title for Pożegnania, a film released in 1958, directed by Wojciech Has.

The film is an adaptation of a highly lyrical and reflective novel by Stanisław Dygat, with a screenplay written by Dygat and Has. Taking place in Poland during the late 1930s and early 1940s, this melancholy film evokes the insecurity and despair pervading Poland at the time. The story begins immediately before World War II and centers on Pawel (Tadeusz Janczar), a member of a conservative, bourgeois family, and his love for the thoroughly jaded Lidka (Maria Wachowiak), a dancer. The mismatched pair finds momentary happiness during a trip to the countryside, however social conventions and the lovers' inability to defy them force Pawel and Lidka to part. The times change, war breaks out and ends; Pawel suffers at Auschwitz concentration camp and Lidka marries his cousin. Years later the two rediscover each other much changed, and find that they may still have the capacity for love.

Cast
Maria Wachowiak as Lidka 
Tadeusz Janczar as Paweł 
Gustaw Holoubek as Mirek 
Stanisław Jaworski as Doctor Janowski 
Stanisław Milski as Professor 
Zdzisław Mrożewski as Paweł's Father 
Irena Netto as Motel Owner 
Józef Pieracki as Professor Michniewicz 
Irena Starkówna Countess Róza 
Helena Sokolowska as Aunt Waleria Siekierzynska 
Hanna Skarzanka as Maryna 
Jarema Stepowski as Waiter 
Saturnin Zórawski as Butler Feliks

See also 
Cinema of Poland
List of Polish language films

External links

1958 films
Polish black-and-white films
Films directed by Wojciech Has
Films based on Polish novels
1950s Polish-language films
1958 drama films